Poplar Plains is an unincorporated community in Fleming County, Kentucky, in the United States.

History
A post office was established at Poplar Plains in 1823, and remained in operation until it was discontinued in 1926. Poplar Plains was incorporated in 1831.

References

Unincorporated communities in Fleming County, Kentucky
Unincorporated communities in Kentucky